Armadillo Peak is a 7.5-million-year-old caldera, located about 3 km north of Bourgeaux Creek and northeast of Raspberry Pass, British Columbia, Canada. It is south of Mount Edziza and is overlapped by the Ice Peak central volcano, which was formed during the early Pleistocene. Its caldera is largely destroyed by glaciers. It is part of the Mount Edziza volcanic complex, which is made of basaltic lava flows.

See also
Cascade Volcanoes
List of Northern Cordilleran volcanoes
List of volcanoes in Canada
Northern Cordilleran Volcanic Province
Volcanic history of the Northern Cordilleran Volcanic Province
Volcanology of Canada
Volcanology of Western Canada

References

Volcanoes of British Columbia
Two-thousanders of British Columbia
Calderas of British Columbia
Northern Cordilleran Volcanic Province
Stikine Country
Miocene calderas
Polygenetic volcanoes